Her Greatest Hits may refer to:

Her Greatest Hits (Jo Stafford album)
Her Greatest Hits (Belinda Carlisle album)
Her Greatest Hits: Songs of Long Ago, by Carole King
Tina! Her Greatest Hits, by Tina Turner
I Honestly Love You – Her Greatest Hits, by Olivia Newton-John
Waiting for Saturday Night – Her Greatest Hits, by Whigfield